Pervenche Berès (born 10 March 1957 in Paris) is a French politician was a Member of the European Parliament for the Île-de-France until 2019. She is a member of the Socialist Party; part of the Party of European Socialists.

On 28 July 2004, Berès was elected Chair of the Committee on Economic and Monetary Affairs. She was the rapporteur of the Special Committee on the Financial, Economic and Social Crisis (CRIS).

Personal life 
In 1995, she survived a near fatal traffic accident but lost half of her face, which was reconstructed by plastic surgery.

References

1957 births
Living people
Socialist Party (France) MEPs
MEPs for France 1999–2004
MEPs for Île-de-France 2004–2009
MEPs for Île-de-France 2009–2014
MEPs for Île-de-France 2014–2019
20th-century women MEPs for France
21st-century women MEPs for France
Politicians from Paris